Incontro con Mina is a compilation album by Italian singer Mina, issued in 1969.

The album was composed of songs taken from the previous albums Dedicato a mio padre (1967), Canzonissima '68 (1968) and I discorsi (1969).

Track listing

1969 compilation albums
Mina (Italian singer) compilation albums
Italian-language compilation albums